Alexandra Sylvia Bailey (born September 24, 1993) is an American former soccer player who played as a midfielder for the Houston Dash in the National Women's Soccer League (NWSL).

Playing career

Texas A&M Aggies, 2011–2014
Bailey attended Texas A&M University, where she played for the Aggies from 2011 to 2014.

Houston Dash, 2015
In 2015, Bailey played for expansion team Houston Dash as an amateur player called up while a number of international players were away from their professional clubs for the 2015 FIFA Women's World Cup. Bailey debuted on May 2, 2015, during a match against FC Kansas City. She scored her first goal for the club on May 31, 2015, a late equalizer during a match against Sky Blue FC. Bailey played in eight matches for the Dash. The team finished in fifth place during the regular season with a  record.

References

External links
 Houston Dash player profile
 Texas A&M player profile
 

1993 births
Living people
American women's soccer players
Texas A&M Aggies women's soccer players
Houston Dash players
National Women's Soccer League players
Soccer players from San Diego
Women's association football midfielders
21st-century American women